The Azerbaijan Supercup  was a football competition, held at the beginning of each domestic season and disputed between the winners of the Azerbaijan Premier League and the winners of the Azerbaijan Cup. It was held in 1993–1995 period as "Sahar" Supercup. From 1996 the competition became inactive. The competition was reestablished in 2013, although it is not held since.

History
Neftchi Baku holds the record for winning the Supercup the most times, winning it two times since the competition began in 1993. In 1994, Qarabağ were awarded automatically with the Supercup after the team won both the domestic title and the Azerbaijan Cup.

In 2013, the Professional Football League of Azerbaijan decided to restore the Azerbaijan Supercup.

Khazar Lankaran were the first winners of the restored Supercup.

Winners

Total Titles

See also 
Azerbaijan Premier League
Azerbaijan Cup

References

 
Supercup
Azerbaijan
Recurring sporting events established in 1993
1993 establishments in Azerbaijan